Peter Smith (born 17 September 1955) is an English former professional rugby league footballer who played in the 1970s, 1980s and 1990s.

Background
Peter Smith was born in Pontefract, West Riding of Yorkshire, England, and he is the grandfather of the rugby league footballer Morgan Smith.

Playing career

International honours
Peter Smith won a cap for England while at Featherstone Rovers in 1980 against France, and won caps for Great Britain while at Featherstone Rovers in the 1977 Rugby League World Cup against Australia (sub) (2 matches), in 1982 against Australia, in 1983 against France (sub) (2 matches), in 1984 against France (sub).

County honours
Peter Smith won caps for Yorkshire while at Featherstone Rovers; during the 1978–79 season against Lancashire, during the 1981–82 season against Lancashire, during the 1982–83 season against Lancashire, and during the 1986–87 season against Lancashire.

Challenge Cup Final appearances
Peter Smith played  in Featherstone Rovers' 14–12 victory over Hull F.C. in the 1983 Challenge Cup Final during the 1982–83 season at Wembley on Saturday 7 May 1983, in front of a crowd of 84,969.

County Cup Final appearances
Peter Smith played right-, i.e. number 12, and scored a try in Featherstone Rovers' 12–16 defeat by Leeds in the 1976 Yorkshire County Cup Final during the 1976–77 season at Headingley Rugby Stadium, Leeds on Saturday 16 October 1976, played as an interchange/substitute, i.e. number 15, (replacing  Richard "Charlie" Stone) in the 7–17 defeat by Castleford in the 1977 Yorkshire County Cup Final during the 1977–78 season at Headingley Rugby Stadium, Leeds on Saturday 15 October 1977, and played , and scored a try in the 14–20 defeat by Bradford Northern in the 1989 Yorkshire County Cup Final during the 1989–90 season at Headingley Rugby Stadium, Leeds on Sunday 5 November 1989.

Testimonial match
Peter Smith's benefit season/testimonial match at Featherstone Rovers took place during the 1985–86 season.

Club career
Peter Smith signed for Featherstone Rovers on 31 May 1972, and he made his first-team début for Featherstone Rovers on Sunday 13 January 1974, during his time at Featherstone Rovers he scored seventy-six 3-point tries, and thirty-four 4-point tries.

Honoured at Featherstone Rovers
Peter Smith is a Featherstone Rovers Hall of Fame inductee.

Contemporaneous Article Extract
"Peter Smith Second-row. Was signed as the first captain of the newly formed Scarborough Pirates. Smith, 35 years old, is a former international colleague of Pirates coach Len Casey. Had a long career of over 15 years with Featherstone Rovers, and played in five (sic six) Tests for Great Britain. Recognised as one of the most respected players of his era."

References

External links

1955 births
Living people
England national rugby league team players
English rugby league players
Featherstone Rovers players
Great Britain national rugby league team players
Rugby league locks
Rugby league players from Pontefract
Rugby league second-rows
Scarborough Pirates captains
Scarborough Pirates players
Whitehaven R.L.F.C. coaches
Yorkshire rugby league team players